is an athletic stadium in Ota, Gunma, Japan.

References

External links
Ota city HPl

Football venues in Japan
Rugby union stadiums in Japan
Rugby in Kantō
Athletics (track and field) venues in Japan
Sports venues in Gunma Prefecture
Ōta, Gunma